The men's 110 metres hurdles event at the 2010 World Junior Championships in Athletics was held in Moncton, New Brunswick, Canada, at Moncton Stadium on 23, 24 and 25 July.  99.0 cm (3'3) (junior implement) hurdles were used.

Medalists

Results

Final
25 July
Wind: -2.4 m/s

Semifinals
24 July

Semifinal 1
Wind: +0.4 m/s

Semifinal 2
Wind: -1.1 m/s

Semifinal 3
Wind: -0.9 m/s

Heats
23 July

Heat 1
Wind: -2.2 m/s

Heat 2
Wind: -0.8 m/s

Heat 3
Wind: +0.1 m/s

Heat 4
Wind: +1.0 m/s

Heat 5
Wind: -0.5 m/s

Heat 6
Wind: +1.6 m/s

Heat 7
Wind: +1.3 m/s

Participation
According to an unofficial count, 48 athletes from 36 countries participated in the event.

References

110 metres hurdles
Sprint hurdles at the World Athletics U20 Championships